Hong-gi, also spelled Hong-ki, Hongkee is a Korean masculine given name. Its meaning differs based on the hanja used to write each syllable of the name. There are 11 hanja with the reading "hong" and 68 hanja with the reading "gi" on the South Korean government's official list of hanja which may be registered for use in given names.

People with this name include:
Han Hong-ki (1924–1996), South Korean footballer
Choi Hong-ki (born 1947), stage name Na Hoon-a, South Korean trot singer
Shin Hong-gi (born 1968), South Korean footballer
Lee Hong-gi (born 1990), South Korean idol singer
Justin Hongkee Min (born 1990), American actor 

Fictional characters with this name include:
Hong-ki, in 1999 South Korean film City of the Rising Sun

See also
List of Korean given names

References

Korean masculine given names